Marko Luomala (born June 2, 1980) is a Finnish former professional ice hockey player. He played in Liiga for Ässät, Ilves, Lukko, Oulun Kärpät, Kloten Flyers, HPK and Vaasan Sport.

Career statistics

References

External links

1980 births
Living people
Ässät players
Ferencvárosi TC (ice hockey) players
Finnish ice hockey forwards
HC Gardena players
HPK players
EHC Kloten players
Ilves players
Lukko players
Milton Keynes Lightning players
Olofströms IK players
Oulun Kärpät players
Vaasan Sport players
Sportspeople from Vaasa